Korvuanjärvi is a medium-sized lake of Finland. It is situated partly in Taivalkoski municipality in Northern Ostrobothnia region and partly in Suomussalmi municipality in Kainuu region. It belongs to the Iijoki main catchment area.

See also
List of lakes in Finland

References

Lakes of Taivalkoski
Lakes of Suomussalmi